Firemen's Tower may refer to:

Firemen's Tower (Veszprém), Hungary
Firemen's Tower (Satu Mare), Romania